The 2021 In It To Win It 200 presented by the South Carolina Education Lottery was the 17th stock car race of the 2021 NASCAR Camping World Truck Series, and the inaugural running of the 2nd Darlington Raceway truck race. The race was held in Darlington, South Carolina at Darlington Raceway, a  egg-shaped oval on September 4, 2021, over 147 laps. Sheldon Creed of GMS Racing would win the race, leading 104 laps. John Hunter Nemechek of Kyle Busch Motorsports and Stewart Friesen of Halmar Friesen Racing would take 2nd and 3rd, respectively.

Background

Starting lineup

Race results

Stage 1

Stage 2

Stage 3

References 

2021 NASCAR Camping World Truck Series
NASCAR races at Darlington Raceway
In It To Win It 200
In It To Win It 200